Lloyd Ivan McDermott (December 20, 1925 – January 16, 1964) was an American football defensive tackle.

A native of Covington, Kentucky, he played college football for the Kentucky Wildcats. He played professional football in the National Football League (NFL) for the Detroit Lions during the 1949 season and for the Chicago Cardinals in the 1949 and 1950 seasons. He appeared in a total of 24 NFL games and had 13 receptions. He also played for Ottawa in the Canadian Football League. He served in the United States Marine Corps during World War II and later coached football and basketball at Covington Homes High School. He died in 1964 at age 38.

References

1925 births
1964 deaths
Chicago Cardinals players
Detroit Lions players
Kentucky Wildcats football players
Players of American football from Kentucky
Sportspeople from Covington, Kentucky
United States Marine Corps personnel of World War II